XXX is a South Korean hip hop duo consisting of rapper Kim Ximya (김심야) and producer FRNK (프랭크).

Career 
Kim Ximya met FRNK (Park Jin-su) in an online amateur music community and formed the group after discovering the latter's musical work.

Described as an experimental hip hop group, they released their debut seven-song EP Kyomi on July 9, 2016. XXX's debut studio album, Language, was released on November 28, 2018. Their musical style is described as "dark hip-hop with a frenetic electro edge."

Discography

Studio albums

Extended plays

Awards and nominations

Korean Hip-hop Awards

Korean Music Awards

References

External links 
 

South Korean hip hop groups
South Korean musical duos
Musical groups established in 2016
2016 establishments in South Korea